Octave Gréard (18 April 1828 – 25 April 1904) was a noted French educator.

Gréard was born in Vire, Calvados, educated at the École Normale Supérieure, and had a long career in education. He was largely responsible for the establishment of schools for girls and played a significant role in reforming the baccalauréat.

Gréard was elected member of the Académie des sciences morales et politiques in 1875 and the Académie française in 1886. A college bearing his name is located in the 8th arrondissement of Paris.

Works 
 L'Enseignement secondaire des filles (Secondary education of girls)
 L’Éducation des femmes par les femmes (Education for women by women)
 Étude sur les Lettres d'Abélard et d'Héloïse (Review of Letters of Abelard and Heloise)
 Nos adieux à la vieille Sorbonne (Our farewell to the old Sorbonne)

References 
Notice biographique de l'Académie française (French)
Collège Octave Gréard (French)

1828 births
1904 deaths
People from Vire
French educators
École Normale Supérieure alumni
Members of the Académie Française
Members of the Académie des sciences morales et politiques